Nigel Osborne  (born 23 June 1948) is a British composer, teacher and aid worker. He served as Reid Professor of Music at the University of Edinburgh and has also taught at the Hochschule für Musik, Theater und Medien Hannover. He is known for his extensive charity work supporting war traumatised children using music therapy techniques, especially in the Balkans during the disastrous Bosnian War, and in the Syrian conflict. He speaks eight languages.

Osborne was born in Manchester, England, to a Scottish family. He studied composition with Kenneth Leighton, Egon Wellesz, and Witold Rudziński. His compositions include the opera The Electrification of the Soviet Union, Concerto for Flute and Chamber Orchestra commissioned by the City of London Sinfonia, I am Goya, Remembering Esenin, and Birth of the Beatles Symphony.

Osborne retired from his Edinburgh University position in 2012, and is now working internationally as freelance composer, arranger and aid worker.

Career

Osborne studied composition with Egon Wellesz, the first pupil of Arnold Schoenberg (1968–69), also with Kenneth Leighton (his predecessor as Reid Professor of Music at the University of Edinburgh) at Oxford University (1969–70), and later in Warsaw with Witold Rudziński (1970–71) where he also he worked in the Polish Radio Experimental Studio. From 1983 until 1985, while at the IRCAM in Paris, he co-founded Contemporary Music Review with Tod Machover. He held a lectureship and special professorship at the University of Nottingham from 1978 to 1987, the Reid Chair and dean of the faculty of music at Edinburgh University from 1989 to 2012, a senior professorship (C4) at the University of Hannover from 1996 to 1998 and head of faculty for the Vienna–Prague–Budapest Summer Academy (ISA) from 2007 to 2014. He is currently professor emeritus at Edinburgh University, visiting professor in the drama faculty of Rijeka University and consultant to the Chinese Music Institute, Peking University. He has worked as visiting lecturer and examiner also at Harvard, UCLA, CalArts, Gedai and Toho Gakuen School of Music, Oxford, the Sorbonne and Bologna.

Osborne's works have been performed around the world by major orchestras and opera houses, including the Vienna Symphony, Moscow Symphony Orchestra, Leningrad Philharmonic, the Philharmonia of London, Los Angeles Philharmonic, Berlin Symphony, Glyndebourne, Opera Circus, Opera Factory, Scottish Opera and the Royal Opera House. He has received, among numerous awards, a Netherlands Gaudeamus prize, the Opera Prize of the Radio Sussie Romande and Ville de Geneve, and the Koussevitzky Award of the Library of Congress Washington. He also composes for theatre and film and has a "secret history" of work in popular music and rock 'n roll – he plays in a heavy metal band (The Godfather) with his son Ruaraidh.

In the 1980s, Osborne composed a series of "classic works" for choreographer Richard Alston and Ballet Rambert. He has been Master of Music at the Shakespeare's Globe (1999–2000), and is currently house composer for Ulysses Theatre, Istria (2000–). He has collaborated with notable directors Lenka Udovicki, Peter Sellars, David Pountney, Michael McCarthy and David Freeman, with notable writers Samuel Beckett, Craig Raine, Eve Ensler, Jo Shapcott, Howard Barker, Ariel Dorfman, Tena Štivičić and Goran Simić, with notable actors Vanessa Redgrave, Annette Bening, Lynn Redgrave, Amanda Plummer, Rade Šerbedžija, Simon Callow, Ian McDiarmid and Janet Henfrey, and with notable artists and designers John Hoyland, Dick Smith, George Tsypin, David Roger, Bjanka Adzic Ursulov and Peter Mumford. Singers and soloists include pioneers of contemporary music, such as Jane Manning, Linda Hirst, Liz Lawrence and Omar Ebrahim, and long-standing collaborations with artists Florian Kitt, Ernst Kovacic and the Hebrides Ensemble. His film documentary credits include BAFTA-winning and -nominated collaborations with director Samir Mehanović, an EMMY-winning collaboration with the BBC, and multi-award- winning films with Helen Doyle and InformAction, Montreal. He has a special interest in Arabic, Indian and Chinese music.

Osborne has pioneered methods of using music and the creative arts to support children who are victims of conflict. This approach was developed during the war in Bosnia-Herzegovina (1992–95), and since then this work has been implemented widely in the Balkan region, the Caucasus, the Middle East, East Africa, South East Asia and India. He was also been awarded the Freedom Prize of the Peace Institute, Sarajevo, for his work for Bosnian children during the siege of the city. He has worked actively in many human rights initiatives, including the Workers' Defence Committee in Poland (1970–89), Citizens' Forum and the Jazz Section with Václav Havel in former Czechoslovakia (1987–1989), for Syrian refugee support organisations and directly for the Government of Bosnia-Herzegovina during the genocide. From 2012 until 2014, Osborne served as co-chair of the Global Agenda Committee for Arts in Society for the World Economic Forum.

In 2004 he began a long term artistic relationship with Tina Ellen Lee of Opera Circus, a chamber opera and music theatre company now based in West Dorset UK. Together they developed and produced the Bosnian sevdah opera Differences in Demolitions with Bosnian poet Goran Simić and Scottish conductor William Conway. They toured through BiH in 2017 and in 2010 performed this first ever live opera in Srebrenica before heading for Vienna and the Hofburg.

Osborne has been active in supporting the development of new music technologies, for example the Skoog, and is co-inventor with Paul Robertson of X-System, an informatic modelling of the musical brain capable of predicting emotional response to music of any culture, designed for both medical and leisure applications. He is currently a field worker for SAWA for Development and Aid in Lebanon. In December 2017 he received the British Academy of Songwriters, Composers, and Authors' (BASCA) Award for Inspiration. He continues to work in special education development in Scotland, Sweden, Croatia and India. He was awarded both the Queen's Prize and Music Industry Prize for innovation in education, and was recently made honorary fellow of the Educational Institute of Scotland. He is a director of the Scottish educational development company, Tapestry Partnership.

In 2017, Osborne was commissioned by the Royal Liverpool Philharmonic Orchestra to arrange Sgt. Pepper's Lonely Hearts Club Band for the It Was Fifty Years Ago Today concerts with the Bootleg Beatles performed to capacity crowds at the Royal Albert Hall and Echo Arena Liverpool.

Publications

Recent scientific and scholarly publications
 Osborne, Nigel. (23 February 2017). Handbook of Musical Identities - "The Identities of Sevda: from Graeco-Arabic medicine to music therapy". Editors: MacDonald, Hargreaves and Miell. . Oxford University Press. (Oxford, UK and New York).
 Osborne, Nigel. (21 February 2017) Love, Rhythm and Chronobiology in Rhythms of Relating in Children’s Therapies – 'Connecting Creatively with Vulnerable Children'. Editors: Daniel and Trevarthen. . Jessica Kingsley Publishers. (London, UK and Philadelphia, USA).
 Osborne, Nigel. (2014). "The Plenum Brain in Unbribable Bosnia and Herzegovina". p. 174. Editor: D. Arsenijević South East European integration perspectives. ISBN print: , ISBN online: . Nomos Verlag. (Baden-Baden, Germany).
 
 Osborne, Nigel. (July 2013). "Resilience and recovery – violence, disasters and the arts, presentation, Global Alliance for Arts and Health". APPG on Agriculture and Food for Development. Library of Congress. (Washington DC, USA).
 Osborne, Nigel. (23 April 2012). "Neuroscience and real world practice: music as a therapeutic resource for children in zones of conflict". New York Academy of Sciences. Neurosciences and Music. (New York, USA).
 Osborne, Nigel. 2009. "Music for children in zones of conflict and postconflict: a psychobiological approach". In Communicative Musicality. Editors: S. Malloch and C. Trevarthen. . Oxford University Press and New York Academy of Sciences. (Oxford, UK and New York, USA).

Selected publications

University of York Music Press

Source:
 2013
 The Painters in my Garden for three flutes
 A Prayer and Two Blessings for SATB choir
 2011
Botanical Studies for oboe and percussion
 2010
 Concertino for Violin and Orchestra for solo violin and orchestra
 Differences in Demolition (A sevdah opera)
 I am not here for voice and piano (only available in Songs for the Twenty-First Century)
 Journey to the End of the Night for oboe, percussion and electronics
 SMTBarBar for soli, clarinet, percussion, violin, viola, cello, accordion and machine sounds Stargazing string quartet
 2009
 The Birth of Naciketas guitar concertante for guitar, Indian violin, tabla, string quartet,double bass and percussion
 2009
 Afro-Scottish for children's choir, SATB choir and jazz orchestra
 Angel-Nebulae for TTTB soli
 East for symphony orchestra
 La Belle Hélène for three flutes (doubling alto flute and piccolo) and cello
 Naturtöne / Abschied SATTBarB choir
 Queens of Govan for chamber opera for mezzo soprano, recorded voices and 15 instruments
 Rock Music for 12 instruments and electronic materials
 7 Words, 7 Icons, 7 Cities for SATB choir (with divisi) and string orchestra
 Stone Garden for 2 cellos and accordion
 Tiree string quartet
 Transformations for 2 solo oboe d'amore 2009 Dialogue oboe and harp
 2008
 Concerto for Viola and Orchestra
 Roma Diary for cello and piano
 2007
 Balkan Dances and Laments for oboe, piano, violin, viola and cello
 Sarajevo for clarinet, piano and cello
 Transformations for 1 two violas 2007 Taw-Raw solo violin
 2006
 The Piano Tuner for piano trio
 Pulsus for CtTTBar soli and monochord
 2004
 String Quartet No. 1 Medicinal Songs and Dances
 1999
 Concerto for Oboe and Chamber Orchestra

Universal Edition

Source:

 Various
 Adagio für Vedran Smailović für Violoncello
 After Night | 1977: für Gitarre | 8
 Figure/Ground für Klavier solo
 For a Moment für Frauenchor, Violoncello und Kandyan Drum (ad lib.) | 15
 Remembering esenin für Violoncello und Klavier
 2013
 Espionage | 2013: 3 miniature sonatas, studies in Poussin and happenstance | für Violine solo | 8
 1993
 The Art of Fugue | 1993: für Violoncello und Instrumente | 20 2 2 2 2 – 2 2 0 0 – Schl – Str
 Hommage à Panufnik | 1993: für Streichorchester | 8
 1992
 Terrible Mouth | 1992 Musiktheater | 120
 1991
 Albanian Nights | 1991: für Ensemble | 12 2 2 2 2 – 2 0 0 0
 Graffiti after Cy Twombly | 1991: on the musical letters of Alfred Schlee | für Streichquartett
 Schleedoyer II | 1991: für Streichquartett | 1 30
 The Sun of Venice | 1991: für Orchester | 25 – 30' 3 3 3 3 – 3 3 2 1 – Schl(3) – 2 Hf, Cel, Klav – Str – 2 konzertante Gruppen
 1990
 Canzona – Procession of Boats with Distant, Smoke, Venice | 1990: für Horn, 4 Trompeten, 4 Posaunen und Tuba | 12
 Eulogy | 1990: für Kammerensemble | 8 1 1 1 1 – 1 1 1 0 – Schl, Klav, StrQuint
 Tracks | 1990: für 2 gemischte Chöre, Orchester und Blasorchester | 30 4 4 5 5 – 6 4 4 1 – Pk, Schl(4), Hf, Klav, Str; 3 4 6 5 – 6 4 6 1 – Schl(6), 6 Kor, 4 Euph
 Violin Concerto | 1990: für Violine und Orchester | 22 2 2 2 2 – 3 2 2 0 – Schl(3) – Hf, Klav – Str
 1988
 Esquisse 2 | 1988: für 11 Solostreicher | 10 Vl(6), Va(2), Vc(2), Kb(1)
 Stone Garden | 1988: für Kammerensemble | 15 Fl, Ob, Kl, Fg, Hr, Trp, Pos – Schl – Hf – StreichQuint
 1987
 The Electrification of the Soviet Union | 1987: Oper in 2 Akten | 120
 Esquisse 1 | 1987: für 11 Solostreicher | 7 Vl(6), Va(2), Vc(2), Kb(1)
 1985
 Hell's Angels | 1985: Kammeroper in 2 Akten | 120 Kaufausgabe
 Pornography | 1985 für Mezzosopran und Kammerensemble | 13
 Zansa | 1985: für Kammerensemble | 20 1 1 1 1 – 1 1 1 0 – Schl, Klav, "Zansa" – 2 Vl, Va, Vc, Kb
 1984
 Alba | 1984: für Mezzosopran, Kammerorchester und Tonband | 17 1 1 1 0 – 1 1 1 0 – Schl – Hf – 2 Vl, Va, Vc, Kb
 Wildlife | 1984: für Kammerensemble | 20 Fl, Kl – Hr, Trp – Schl – Hf – Vl, Va, Vc, elektrischer Kb – Elektronik
 1983
 Fantasia | 1983: für Kammerensemble | 12 1 1 1 1 – 1 0 0 0 – Klav, Vl(1), Va(1), Vc(1), Kb(1)
 2. Sinfonia | 1983: für Orchester | 19 4 4 4 5 – 4 4 4 1 – Schl, Vib, Hf, Cel, Klav, T-T, Str Kaufausgabe
 1982
 Cantata piccola | 1982 für Sopran und Streichquartett | 10
 1. Sinfonia | 1982: für Orchester | 23 4 3 4 3 – 6 4 4 1 – Schl(2) – Hf – Str(16 12 10 8 6)
 1981
 The Cage | 1981: für Tenor und Kammerensemble | 14 Afl(G), Ob, Kl, Fg, Hr, Trp – Vl, Vl, Vc
 Choralis 1-2-3 | 1981-1982: für Sopran, 2 Mezzosoprane, Tenor, Bariton und Bass
 Piano Sonata | 1981: für Klavier | 25
 1980
 Concerto | 1980: für Flöte und Kammerorchester | 16 Ob(2), Hr(2), Str: Vl.I(6), Vl.II(4), Va(3), Vc(2), Kb(1)
 Mythologies | 1980: für Kammerensemble | 15 Kaufausgabe
 Poem without a Hero | 1980: für Sopran, Mezzosopran, Tenor, Bass und Live-Elektronik | 20
 1979
 In Camera | 1979: für Kammerensemble | 19
 Madeleine de la Ste. Baume | 1979: für Sopran und Kontrabass
 Songs From a Bare Mountain | 1979: für Frauenchor | 6
 Under the Eyes | 1979: für Stimme, Schlagzeug, Klavier, Oboe (auch EH) und Flöte (auch Altfl.) | 9
 1977
 Cello Concerto | 1977: für Violoncello und Orchester | 17
 I am Goya | 1977: für Bassbariton, Flöte, Oboe, Violine und Violoncello | 12
 Orlando Furioso | 1977: für gemischten Chor und Bläserensemble | 35
 Vienna – Zurich – Constance | 1977: für Sopran, Violine, Violoncello, 2 Klarinetten und Schlagzeug | 10
 1976
 Passers By | 1976: für Bassblockflöte, Stimme, Violoncello, Elektronik und Bilder
 1975
 Chansonnier | 1975: für gemischten Chor und Kammerensemble | 16
 Prelude and Fugue | 1975: für Kammerensemble | 17
 The Sickle | 1975: für Sopran und Orchester | 11 2 2 2 2 – 2 2 0 0 – Schl – Hf, Git – Str(6 6 4 4 2)
 1974
 Kinderkreuzzug | 1974: für Kinderchor (Vokalisen) und Instrumentalensemble | 22
 1971
7 Words | 1971: Kantate | für 2 Tenöre, Bass, gemischten Chor und Orchester | 24 4 3 4 2 – 3 3 3 0 – Schl, Ondes Martenot, Hf, Sax(3), Str(4 4 4 4 2)

Reviews
Reviews by Nigel Osborne:

Filmography
 2018
 Through Our Eyes – composer
 A Story of Three Islands – composer
 I am Swimming – composer
 2015
 The Fog of Srebrenica – composer
 2014
 Dans un océan d'images – composer
 2006
 The Way We Played – composer
 2003
 Les messagers – composer
 1990
 View from the Bridge – composer
 1988
 The Electrification of the Soviet Union – composer
 1987
 Wildlife – composer
 1984
 The Sea of Faith (6-part documentary series) – composer

Education

BA, BMus(Oxon), DLitt, FRCM, FEIS, FRSE

Awards
 British Academy of Songwriters, Composers, and Authors Award (BASCA) (2017)
 BH Radio 1 Prize (2016)
 Honorary Fellow of the Educational Institute of Scotland (2015)
 DLitt Queen Margaret University (2013)
 Fellow of the Royal Society of Edinburgh (2011)
 Freedom Prize of the Peace Institute Sarajevo (2007)
 MBE (2003)
 Queen's Anniversary Prize (1996)
 Fellow of the Royal College of Music (1996)
 Thorn EMI Prize for Music Education (1993)
 Koussevitzky Award of the Library of Congress Washington (1985)
 Radcliffe Award (1977)
 Netherlands Gaudeamus Prize (1973)
 International Opera Prize of Radio Suisse Romande and Ville de Geneve (1971)
 Osgood Award University of Oxford (1970)

Sources
Scottish Arts Council profile article
The Guardian – "The riddle of the rocks" – on his 2008 trip to Uganda
The Independent – Right of Reply: "The composer Nigel Osborne defends his opera trilogy, Sarajevo"

Citations and references

External links
Nigel Osborne staff profile at University of Edinburgh (archived) 
Grove Music Online (requires login)
Nigel Osborne biography and works on the UE website (former publisher)
Nigel Osborne biography and catalogue on University of York Music Press (current publisher)
 

English classical composers
Musicians from Manchester
Living people
1948 births
Academic staff of the Hochschule für Musik, Theater und Medien Hannover
Academics of the University of Edinburgh
English male classical composers
20th-century English composers
20th-century classical composers
21st-century English composers
21st-century classical composers
English opera composers
Male opera composers
20th-century British male musicians
20th-century British musicians
21st-century British male musicians